Wrony Nowe  is a village in the administrative district of Gmina Giżycko, within Giżycko County, Warmian-Masurian Voivodeship, in northern Poland.

The village did not exist before 1945. Translated it would be "New Wrony" or "Neu Wronnen".

References

Wrony Nowe